= The New York Times Guide to Essential Knowledge =

The New York Times Guide to Essential Knowledge: A Desk Reference for the Curious Mind is a single-volume reference book by The New York Times. It exceeds one thousand pages in length.

Published in 2011, the book covers many topics, including:

- Architecture
- Art
- Astronomy
- Biology
- Chemistry
- Dance
- Economics, Business, and Finance
- Film
- Geography
- Geology
- History
- Law
- Literature
- Drama
- Mathematics
- Media
- Medicine
- Music
- Mythology
- Philosophy
- Photography
- Physics
- Religion
- Science
- Technology
- Sports

There is also a reference library which contains a Writer's Guide, Guide to Nutrition, Nations of the World, U.S. States and cities, languages, biographies and a crossword dictionary.
